Borneman Mill, also known as Stauffer Mill, is a historic "farm mill" located in Washington Township, Berks County, Pennsylvania.  The mill was built to perform farm chores with water power. The mill was built before 1860, and is a two-story, with basement, post-and-beam building with vertical siding. It measures 21 feet, 6 inches, by 24 feet, 6 inches. The mill powered operations in the nearby stone bank barn (after 1850) by use of a cable drive system. Also on the property are a contributing farmhouse (1810, 1850) and smokehouse (c. 1850).

It was listed on the National Register of Historic Places in 1990.

References

Grinding mills on the National Register of Historic Places in Pennsylvania
Industrial buildings completed in 1860
Houses in Berks County, Pennsylvania
Grinding mills in Berks County, Pennsylvania
National Register of Historic Places in Berks County, Pennsylvania